Trygve Diskerud (6 October 1903 – 2 June 1976) is a Norwegian harness racer.

He won 1727 races during his career, among them ten Norwegian championships.

References

1903 births
1976 deaths
Norwegian harness racers